Admetula gittenbergeri is a species of sea snail, a marine gastropod mollusc in the family Cancellariidae, the nutmeg snails.

Description
The size of the whitish, solid shell varies between 11 mm and 14 mm. The protoconch is paucispiral with a slightly less than one whorl and shows fine spiral striae (stretch marks). The teleoconch consists of 3.5 whorls with the second and the third whorl showing five spiral bands and the body whorl with twelve spiral bands. The whorls are axially crossed by twelve and thirteen rounded ribs on the second and third whorls and by ten ribs on the body whorl. The white semicircular aperture has a nacreous gloss. The thick outer lip has no inner lirae. The columella shows two folds with a conspicuous tooth close to the siphonal canal. The umbilicus is closed by a callus. The periostracum is covered with thin, short hairs between the spiral cords.

Distribution
This species is found in the Atlantic Ocean off Mauritania.

References

 Verhecken A. 2002. Atlantic bathyal Cancellariidae (Neogastropoda: Cancellarioidea): additional data, and description of a new species. Journal of Conchology 37(5): 505–514
 Hemmen J. (2007). Recent Cancellariidae. Wiesbaden, 428pp
 Bouchet, P.; Fontaine, B. (2009). List of new marine species described between 2002 and 2006. Census of Marine Life.

External links

Cancellariidae
Gastropods described in 2002